These hits topped the Ultratop 50 in 2017.

See also
List of number-one albums of 2017 (Belgium)
2017 in music

References

Ultratop 50
Belgium Ultratop 50
2017